Michelle Feldman (born April 19, 1976) is a right-handed female professional ten-pin bowler and former member of the Professional Women's Bowling Association (PWBA). She hails from Skaneateles, NY, and now resides in nearby Auburn, NY.  In her career, she won 14 professional titles: 12 on the PWBA Tour and two more in the PBA Women's Series. She was named 2002 PWBA Player of the Year, and was also honored as the Bowling Digest Bowler of the Year in 2002.

She most recently competed in the PBA Women's Series, which was sponsored by the United States Bowling Congress (USBC).  She won two of the first three Women's Series events in the 2008–09 season.  She failed to win a singles title in the 2009–10 season, but finished high enough in points to earn a spot in the season-ending PBA Women's Series Showdown.  Feldman won this April 6–8 event, defeating Shannon Pluhowsky and Stefanie Nation in the finals.

On July 10, 1997, Feldman gained fame by being the first female bowler to roll a 300 game on American national television. She accomplished the feat at the PWBA Southern Virginia Open when she was just 21 years old. 

Feldman has a high-powered, high-rev "cranker" style delivery that is uncommon among female bowlers. The style  earned her the nickname "Twister Sister."

References

Other sources
 Women's Series Player Bios at www.pba.com

American ten-pin bowling players
People from Skaneateles, New York
1976 births
Living people